AVT Khyber or Khyber TV is a Pakistani-operated Pashto satellite television channel in Pakistan, which was launched in July 2004. It is Pakistan’s first Pashto language television channel.

The channel broadcasts 24 hours a day, providing educational, news, variety shows, dramas, and entertaining programs to the Pashtun population of Pakistan and Afghanistan as well as those living in the Middle East, Europe and Australia. Unlike most TV stations in Pakistan, AVT programs are only in Pashto language.

The main office of AVT Khyber is located in Islamabad, Pakistan. It also has regional offices in the cities of Peshawar and Quetta in Pakistan as well as in Jalalabad, Kabul, and Kandahar in Afghanistan.

Frequency information 

 PakSat-1R at 38° East
 Downlink Frequency: 4125 MHz
 Polarity: Vertical
 FEC: 2/3
 Symbol Rate: 6400 KSPS

See also 
 Khyber News
  Khyber Middle East
 List of Pakistani television stations
 Media of Pakistan

References 

Television stations in Pakistan
Mass media in Pakistan
Pashto mass media
Pashto-language television stations
Television channels and stations established in 2004
Mass media in Islamabad
Mass media in Peshawar